In econometrics, the Frisch–Waugh–Lovell (FWL) theorem is named after the econometricians Ragnar Frisch, Frederick V. Waugh, and Michael C. Lovell.

The Frisch–Waugh–Lovell theorem states that if the regression we are concerned with is:

where  projects onto the orthogonal complement of the image of the projection matrix .  Equivalently, MX1 projects onto the orthogonal complement of the column space of X1.  Specifically,

and this particular orthogonal projection matrix is known as the residual maker matrix or annihilator matrix.

This is the basis for understanding the contribution of each single variable to a multivariate regression (see, for instance, Ch. 13 in ).

The theorem also implies that the secondary regression used for obtaining  is unnecessary when the predictor variables are uncorrelated (this never happens in practice): using projection matrices to make the explanatory variables orthogonal to each other will lead to the same results as running the regression with all non-orthogonal explanators included.

It is not clear who did prove this theorem first. However, in the context of linear regression, it was known well before Frisch and Waugh paper. In fact, it can be found  as section 9, pag.184, in the detailed analysis of partial regressions by George Udny Yule  published in 1907. In this paper, Yule stresses the central role of the result in understanding the meaning of multiple and partial regression and  correlation coefficients. See the first paragraph of section 10 on pag. 184 of Yule's 1907 paper.

Yule's results were generally known by 1933 as Yule did include a detailed discussion of partial correlation, his novel partial correlation notation introduced in 1907  and the "Frisch, Waugh and Lovell" theorem, as chapter 10 of his, quite successful, Statistics textbook first issued in 1911 which, by 1932, had reached its tenth edition.

Frisch did quote Yule's results on pag. 389 of a 1931 paper with Mudgett. In this paper Yule's formulas for partial regressions are quoted, and explicitly attributed to Yule, in order to correct misquotes of the same formulas by another Author. In fact, while Yule is not explicitly mentioned in their 1933 paper, Frisch and Waugh use, for the partial regression coefficients,  the notation first introduced by Yule in his 1907 paper and in general use by 1933.

References

Further reading
 
 
 
 
 

Economics theorems
Regression analysis
Theorems in statistics